The women's artistic team all-around competition of the gymnastics events at the 2011 Pan American Games in Guadalajara, Mexico, was held on October 24 at the Nissan Gymnastics Stadium.  The defending champions were Ivana Hong, Shawn Johnson, Nastia Liukin, Samantha Peszek and Amber Trani from the United States.

Results

References

Gymnastics at the 2011 Pan American Games
2011 in women's gymnastics